Archibasis is a genus of damselflies belonging to the family Coenagrionidae.
These damselflies are generally medium-sized with bright colouring.
Archibasis occurs in southern Asia, Indonesia, New Guinea and Australia.

Species 
The genus Archibasis includes the following species:

Archibasis crucigera  
Archibasis incisura  
Archibasis lieftincki  
Archibasis melanocyana  
Archibasis mimetes  
Archibasis oscillans  
Archibasis rebeccae  
Archibasis tenella  
Archibasis viola

References

Coenagrionidae
Zygoptera genera
Odonata of Asia
Odonata of Australia
Taxa named by William Forsell Kirby
Insects described in 1890
Damselflies